In linguistics, pre-stopping, also known as pre-occlusion or pre-plosion, is a phonological process involving the historical or allophonic insertion of a very short stop consonant before a sonorant, such as a short  before a nasal  or a lateral . The resulting sounds are called pre-stopped consonants, or sometimes pre-ploded or (in Celtic linguistics) pre-occluded consonants, although technically  may be considered an occlusive/stop without the pre-occlusion.

A pre-stopped consonant behaves phonologically as a single consonant. That is, like affricates and trilled affricates, the reasons for considering these sequences to be single consonants lies primarily in their behavior. Phonetically they are similar or equivalent to stops with a nasal or lateral release.

Terminology
There are three terms for this phenomenon. The most common by far is prestopped/prestopping. In descriptions of the languages of Southeast Asia, Australia, and the Pacific, preploded/preplosion is common, though prestopped is also used. In accounts of Celtic languages, preoccluded/preocclusion is used almost exclusively. Technically, nasals are already occlusives, and are often considered stops; however, some prefer to restrict the term 'stop' for consonants in which there is complete cessation of airflow, so 'prenasalized stop' and 'prestopped nasal' are not necessarily tautologies.

In European languages

In Manx, pre-occlusion occurs in stressed monosyllabic words (i.e. words one syllable long), and is also found in Cornish on certain stressed syllables. The inserted stop is homorganic with the sonorant, which means it has the same place of articulation. Long vowels are often shortened before pre-occluded sounds. In transcription, pre-occluding consonants in final position are typically written with a superscripted letter in Manx and in Cornish.

Examples in Manx include:
  → :   →  "heavy"
  → :   →  "walking"
  → :   →  "head"
  → :   →  "birds"
  → :   →  "ship"

Examples in Cornish:
  → :   "mother"
  → :   "this"
  → :   "head"
  → :   "heads"

In Faroese, pre-occlusion also occurs, as in kallar  'you call, he calls', seinna  'latter'. A similar feature occurs in Icelandic, as in galli  ('error'); sæll , seinna ; Spánn .

In Australian languages
Pre-stopped nasals and laterals are found in some Australian Aboriginal languages, such as Kuyani (Adnyamathanha), Arabana, Wangkangurru, Diyari, Aranda (nasals only), and Martuthunira (laterals only). Adnyamathanha, for example, has the pre-stopped nasals  and the pre-stopped laterals , though these are all in allophonic variation with the simple nasals and laterals .

In Mon–Khmer languages
Pre-stopped nasals are also found in several branches of Austroasiatic, especially in the North Aslian languages and Shompen, where historical word-final nasals, *m *n *ŋ, have become pre-stopped, or even full voiced stops .

In Austronesian languages
Hiw of Vanuatu is the only Austronesian language that has been reported to have a pre-stopped velar lateral approximant . Its phonological behavior clearly defines it as a prestopped lateral, rather than as a laterally released stop.

Nemi of New Caledonia has consonants that have been described as postnasalized stops, but could possibly be described as prestopped nasals.

See also
Nasal release
Lateral release (phonetics)
Prenasalized consonant
Preaspiration

References

Bibliography

 

Jeff Mielke, 2008. The emergence of distinctive features.
 

Plosives
Nasal consonants